Everything I Do Gonna Be Funky is an album by American jazz-funk guitarist O'Donel Levy recorded in 1974 and released on the Groove Merchant label.

Reception 

Allmusic's Sean Westergaard said: "Everything I Do Gonna Be Funky, O'Donel Levy's follow-up to his excellent Simba, is something of a letdown in comparison. ... None of this is awful; it just lacks the great tunes and arrangements of its predecessor".

Track listing
All compositions by O'Donel Levy except where noted
 "Everything I Do Gonna Be Funky" – 3:20
 "Marbles" – 6:25
 "Will It Go Round in Circles" (Billy Preston, Bruce Fisher) – 3:20
 "Livin' for the City" (Stevie Wonder) – 4:59
 "Sideshow" (Bobby Eli, Vinnie Barrett) – 4:48
 "Willow Weep for Me" (Ann Ronnell) – 6:20
 "Hey, Love!" – 3:17
 "Are You Foolin' Me" – 3:07

Personnel
O'Donel Levy – guitar
Charles Covington – keyboards, synthesizer
Hugh Walker – drums
Judd Watkins – percussion, vocals
Lew Soloff – trumpet (tracks 1 & 3)
Michael Gibson – trombone (tracks 1 & 3)
David Sanborn, Joe Temperley – saxophone (tracks 1 & 3)
George Davis – guitar (tracks 1 & 3)
Ralph MacDonald, James Madison – percussion (tracks 1 & 3)
David Matthews – arranger (tracks 1 & 3)

References

1974 albums
Albums arranged by David Matthews (keyboardist)
Albums produced by Sonny Lester
Groove Merchant albums
Jazz-funk albums
O'Donel Levy albums